Il Male (meaning Evil in English) was an Italian satirical magazine published in Rome, Italy, between 1978 and 1982.

History and profile
Il Male was first published in February 1978 as a biweekly tabloid format political satire magazine. The magazine originated from Italian cartoonist Pino Zac's idea. Tommaso Chiaretti was the first editor-in-chief.

The magazine became later weekly. It started with a circulation of 20.000 copies and reached peaks of 48,000 copies. Its fake covers of prominent newspaper were sensational media pranks; the authors even distributed a fake Pravda in Russia during communist rule. The magazine also published a fake Corriere dello Sport in 1978.

Il Male ceased publication in 1982.

See also
 List of magazines in Italy

References

External links
All covers 1978-1979-1980-1981, n. 45 - Anno II, n. 48 - Anno II

1978 establishments in Italy
1982 disestablishments in Italy
Biweekly magazines published in Italy
Defunct political magazines published in Italy
Italian-language magazines
Italian political satire
Magazines established in 1978
Magazines disestablished in 1982
Magazines published in Rome
Satirical magazines published in Italy
Weekly magazines published in Italy